Hoseynabad Rural District is a rural district (dehestan) in the Central District of Shush County, Khuzestan Province, Iran. At the 2006 census, its population was 42,074, in 7,522 families.  The rural district has 35 villages.

References 

Rural Districts of Khuzestan Province
Shush County